Brock Ungricht (born December 31, 1984) is an American college baseball coach, head coach of the NCAA Division I West Coast Conference's San Diego Toreros. He was the hitting coach and recruiting coordinator at San Diego from 2019 to 2021. Prior to San Diego, Ungricht was a scout for the St. Louis Cardinals from 2017–2018 and an assistant coach at Stanford from 2011-2016.

Playing career
Brock Ungricht played three years of college baseball at San Diego State from 2004 to 2006. In 2005, he played collegiate summer baseball with the Orleans Cardinals of the Cape Cod Baseball League. He was selected by the New York Yankees in the 30th round of the 2006 Major League Baseball draft. Ungricht played for the GCL Yankees in 2006 and the Chico Outlaws in 2007 before retiring from professional baseball.

References

Living people
1984 births
San Diego State Aztecs baseball players
Orleans Firebirds players
Gulf Coast Yankees players
Chico Outlaws players
Stanford Cardinal baseball coaches
San Diego Toreros baseball coaches